Robert Gabriel Mugabe International Airport , (known colloquially as "RGM", or Mugabe Airport) formerly known as the Harare International Airport, is an international airport in Harare, Zimbabwe. It is the largest airport in the country and serves as the base of Air Zimbabwe. The airport is operated by the Civil Aviation Authority of Zimbabwe. It was originally built as Salisbury Airport.

History
Commissioned in 1956, and officially opened on 5 February 1957; Salisbury Airport cost £924,000 to build. According to the 1950 report of the Director of Civil Aviation, the city's original aerodrome, Belvedere Airport, had proved to be inadequate and had to be abandoned for the following reasons:
 the runway was some 45° out of alignment, given that approaching aircraft had to enter through a gap in Warren Hills;
 because of the skewed align, aircraft were forced to take-off over the city centre, which posed a real danger of accidents;
 the growing number of high-rise buildings in the city, particularly Milton Building, posed a risk to aircraft;
 Belvedere Airport had been built to accommodate the RAF Elementary Flying Training School, so the layout and design of the buildings were not particularly suitable for commercial aviation.

A site therefore had to be found for the construction of an airport that would be safer and more suitable for commercial activities.

The Southern Rhodesian government had appointed a Southern Rhodesia Aerodrome Board as early as January 1947, whose task was to advise the government on the selection, acquisition, construction and maintenance of government aerodromes and landing grounds in Southern Rhodesia. Later the same year, an Airfield Construction Unit was formed to undertake an extensive search for a suitable site for a national airport.

In 1949, the government purchased Kentucky and Adair farms east of Salisbury (2,700 acres at a cost of £54,000) for the construction of the new airport. Also in 1949 the Minister of Mines and Transport set up an Airport Panel to co-ordinate the construction of the airport. The Panel comprised representatives of the interested government departments, the Municipality of Salisbury and Rhodesia Railways.

In 1951 the government announced that the airport would be developed as a joint user aerodrome for both civil aviation and the Southern Rhodesian Air Force (SRAF). Construction of the airport began soon afterwards, and by September 1951, an 8,400 ft runway had been completed, enabling the first aircraft, an SRAF Anson, to land at the new airport.

Originally, it was anticipated that the airport would be completed by 1954. It was, however, not completed until two years later, because the government ran out of funds in October 1952 and had to suspend the project temporarily. The new Salisbury Airport was finally commissioned on 1 July 1956 by the Government of Rhodesia and Nyasaland. The cost of building the airport was £924,000.

On 18 April 1980, South Rhodesia was officially renamed as Zimbabwe, following its independence from Britain.

As a result of internal political conflicts since 2000, there has been a decline in tourists to Zimbabwe. Consequently there are only two non-African airlines that serve the country: Emirates and Qatar Airways. Formerly British Airways, KLM, Lufthansa, Swissair, Qantas and Air France all served Harare International Airport for many years.

On 9 November 2017, Harare International Airport was officially, and controversially, renamed after the second President of Zimbabwe, Robert Mugabe, to Robert Gabriel Mugabe International Airport, a decision that was announced earlier in September 2017 and sparked a controversy, as many Zimbabweans felt that too many places in the country had already been renamed after Mugabe.

Facilities
Air Rhodesia established its headquarters at the airport in 1967, and since Zimbabwean independence in 1980, Air Rhodesia's successor, Air Zimbabwe, has maintained the status quo with its head office located at the airport as well. Civil aviation regulatory authority, the Civil Aviation Authority of Zimbabwe has its head office on level 3 of the new International Terminal.

In August 2018, Boeing announced that it is in negotiations with Zimbabwean authorities to establish a regional hub for Boeing aeroplanes for providing training and expert technical services at the airport.

Airlines and destinations

Notes
  This flight operates via Lusaka. However, this carrier does not have rights to transport passengers solely between Harare and Lusaka.
  This flight operates via Lusaka. However, this carrier does not have rights to transport passengers solely between Harare and Lusaka.
  Flights to and from Kigali have a stopover in Harare. The airline has full traffic rights to transport passengers between Harare and Cape Town.

Statistics

Accidents and incidents
In July 1984, Vickers Viscount Z-YNI of Air Zimbabwe was damaged beyond economic repair in an accident on the ground. It was withdrawn from use as a result and passed to the airport's fire department for use as a training aid.
On 20 September 1987, Douglas C-47A Z-WRJ of Crest Breeders crashed shortly after take-off following a loss of power from the starboard engine. The aircraft was on a cargo flight. All three crew survived.
On 3 November 2009, Air Zimbabwe Xian MA60 performing flight UM-239 hit five warthogs on take-off. The take-off was rejected but the undercarriage collapsed, causing substantial damage to the aircraft.

References

External links

 Civil Aviation Authority of Zimbabwe 

Buildings and structures in Harare
Airports in Zimbabwe
Robert Mugabe
Naming controversies